(born Tokyo, 24 March 1978) is a Japanese former rugby union player. He played as wing and as centre.

Career
In 1996, after graduating from Kyoto Gakuen High School, Miki entered Ryukoku University, where he would play the All-Japan University Rugby Championship. He debuted for Japan on 20 August 1999, against Spain. He also took part at the 1999 Rugby World Cup, but did not play any match in the tournament. In 2000, Miki graduated from Ryukoku University and joined the Toyota Motors club. A year later, he played for Japan Sevens in the 2001 Rugby World Cup Sevens. In 2004, he moved to World Fighting Bull in the Top League and ended his international career after a disastrous European tour in 2004, in the match against Wales, at the Millennium Stadium, on 26 November. In 2005, Miki was called up to play for Japan Sevens in the 2005 Rugby World Cup Sevens and moved to Honda Heat. In 2008, he moved to Sanyo Wild Knights. Miki retired as player in 2011 after playing the season for Panasonic Wild Knights.

Notes

External links

1978 births
Living people
Japanese rugby union players
Rugby union wings
Rugby union centres
Japan international rugby union players
Saitama Wild Knights players
Toyota Verblitz players
Mie Honda Heat players
Japan international rugby sevens players
Asian Games medalists in rugby union
Rugby union players at the 2002 Asian Games
Asian Games silver medalists for Japan
Medalists at the 2002 Asian Games